Status aparte (Latin for "separate state") refers to the special status of Aruba between 1986 and 2010 as a constituent country within the Kingdom of the Netherlands, separate from the Netherlands Antilles to which it belonged until 1986. With the dissolution of the Netherlands Antilles in October 2010, the term status aparte was no longer used, as the status of Aruba was no longer separate, but rather the norm for all countries within the Kingdom.

History
Since the 1930s, the call for a greater degree of independence from Curaçao has been heard in Aruba. It wasn't until the 1970s that the call became more apparent with Betico Croes starting a political party (MEP) and becoming the leader of the Status Aparte movement. The goal was for Aruba to take a separate status in the Kingdom, apart from the Netherlands Antilles and, after the independence of Suriname in 1975, to become the third constituent country in the Kingdom. After years of negotiations, Croes managed to enforce the secession of Aruba from the Netherlands Antilles, as of January 1, 1986, on the condition however that Aruba would become independent ten years later, in 1996. Although that is not what the MEP wanted, they agreed.

In 1990 Aruba and the Netherlands decided to reverse the original condition of independence and keep Aruba in the Kingdom. Negotiations were finalized in 1994.

After Curaçao and Sint Maarten got a similar status as Aruba, in 2010, the status aparte of Aruba as a result practically ceased to exist.

See also
 Dissolution of the Netherlands Antilles

References

Government of Aruba
Latin political words and phrases